PopArt: The Hits is a greatest hits album by English synth-pop duo Pet Shop Boys. It was released on 24 November 2003 by Parlophone. The album consists of Pet Shop Boys' top 20 UK singles along with two new tracks, "Miracles" and "Flamboyant", which were also released as singles.

History
The most notable exclusion was "Was It Worth It?" (which was included as a brand new song on Discography: The Complete Singles Collection) because it only peaked at number 24, while "How Can You Expect to Be Taken Seriously?" (part of a double A-side with a cover of "Where the Streets Have No Name (I Can't Take My Eyes off You)" by U2 cover) was also omitted.

The album reached number 30 in the UK Albums Chart on original release and re-entered the UK charts in 2009 at number 18. It kept on selling steadily, and proved a strong seller in other countries (with its best chart position in Norway, peaking at #2). Pet Shop Boys stated on their website they were happy with sales. The weekend after the Pet Shop Boys received the Brit Award for Outstanding Contribution to Popular Music in February 2009, PopArt re-entered the UK Albums Chart at number 19, advancing to number 18 the week after.

Unlike some "best of" compilations (including the earlier Discography: The Complete Singles Collection), the tracks on the discs are not arranged chronologically, but split into two categories. Neil Tennant and Chris Lowe split the tracks into ones they thought were pure pop music ("Pop") and the ones that they thought were more creative and experimental ("Art").

A special limited edition was released with a third Compact Disc (CD), "Mix", appropriately featuring Tennant and Lowe's favourite remixes from their career.

The album edit of "Heart" was used on PopArt instead of the single edit. A previously unreleased version of "I Wouldn't Normally Do This Kind of Thing", using the structure of the seven-inch mix but with some elements of the album version, was also used instead of the version that had appeared on the 1993 single release. Several of the other tracks on the album appear in slightly different edits from their original single versions, such as "Suburbia", which for the first time appears in its music video edit on a Pet Shop Boys compilation album, instead of the seven-inch single remix of that song and "New York City Boy" which featured a re-edit of the US Radio Edit. A similar incident occurred with the Brazilian compilation Party in 2009. The US version of PopArt included the single versions of these tracks, but still omits the same tracks as the UK release.

After three years of its release in the rest of the world, PopArt was finally released in the United States in October 2006. The delay was due to legal problems caused by the fact that since Pet Shop Boys began, they have been with four different record labels in the US: EMI (1985–1995), Atlantic (1996–1998), Sire Records (1999–2001) and Sanctuary Records (2002–2003). The album did not chart in the US but has sold almost 100,000 copies since its release.

The album was re-issued on 26 November 2007 in the UK as a box set with the corresponding DVD included.

Track listing

Pop
 "Go West" – 5:03  from album Very
 "Suburbia" (Video Mix) – 5:10  original song from album Please
 "Se a vida é (That's the Way Life Is)" – 3:59  from album Bilingual
 "What Have I Done to Deserve This?" – 4:18  from album Actually
 "Always on My Mind" (7" Version) – 4:00  from album Discography: The Complete Singles Collection, original song from album Introspective
 "I Wouldn't Normally Do This Kind of Thing" (Beatmasters 7" Version) – 4:44 (U.K. release) or 4:28 (U.S. release)  original song from album Very
 "Home and Dry" – 3:58  from album Release
 "Heart"  (album version) – 3:57 (U.K. release) or 4:17 (U.S. release)  U.K. release from album Actually, U.S. release from album Discography: The Complete Singles Collection
 "Miracles" – 3:54  previously unreleased, but later released on album Release Further Listening Volume 2 (disc 3)
 "Love Comes Quickly" – 4:17  from album Please
 "It's a Sin" – 4:59 - from album Actually
 "Domino Dancing" (7" Version) – 4:17  from album Discography: The Complete Singles Collection, original song from album Introspective
 "Before" – 4:05  from album Bilingual
 "New York City Boy" (U.S. Radio Edit Re-edited) – 3:20  original song from album Nightlife
 "It's Alright" (7" Version) – 4:19  from album Discography: The Complete Singles Collection, original song from album Introspective
 "Where the Streets Have No Name (I Can't Take My Eyes off You)" (7" Version) – 4:29  from album Discography: The Complete Singles Collection
 "A Red Letter Day" (Single mix) – 4:32  original song from the album Bilingual

Art
 "Left to My Own Devices" (7" Version) – 4:47  from album Discography: The Complete Singles Collection, original song on album Introspective
 "I Don't Know What You Want But I Can't Give It Any More" (Single Version) – 4:23  original song from album Nightlife
 "Flamboyant" (7" Mix) – 3:50 (U.K. release) or (3:40 U.S. release)  previously unreleased, but later released on album Release: Further Listening (2001–2004).
 "Being Boring" (7" Version) – 4:50  from album Discography: The Complete Singles Collection, original song from album Behaviour
 "Can You Forgive Her?" – 3:52  from album Very
 "West End Girls" (7" Version) – 4:03  original song from album Please
 "I Get Along" (Single Version) – 4:10  original song from album Release
 "So Hard" – 3:58  from album Behaviour
 "Rent" (7" Version) – 3:33  from album Discography: The Complete Singles Collection, original song from album Actually
 "Jealousy" (7" version) – 4:15  from album Discography: The Complete Singles Collection, original song from album Behaviour
 "DJ Culture" – 4:20 from album Discography: The Complete Singles Collection
 "You Only Tell Me You Love Me When You're Drunk" – 3:12  from album Nightlife
 "Liberation" – 4:05  from album Very
 "Paninaro '95" – 4:09 (non-album single), from album Bilingual: Further Listening 1995–1997
 "Opportunities (Let's Make Lots of Money)" – 3:44  from album Please
 "Yesterday, When I Was Mad" (Single Version) – 4:00  original song from album Very
 "Single-Bilingual" (Single Version) – 3:29  original song from Bilingual
 "Somewhere" (Single Version) – 4:42  original song from album Bilingual Special Edition

Mix (Disc 3 – Limited edition CD)
 "Can You Forgive Her?" (Rollo Remix) – 6:00
 "So Hard" (David Morales Red Zone Mix) – 7:42
 "What Have I Done to Deserve This?" (Shep Pettibone Mix) – 8:08
 "West End Girls" (Sasha Mix) – 7:45
 "Miserablism" (Moby Electro Mix) – 5:35
 "Before" (Danny Tenaglia Classic Paradise Mix) – 7:56
 "I Don't Know What You Want but I Can't Give It Any More" (Peter Rauhofer New York Mix) – 10:26
 "New York City Boy" (Lange Mix) – 7:04
 "Young Offender" (Jam & Spoon Trip-o-matic Fairy Tale Mix) – 7:18
 "Love Comes Quickly" (Blank & Jones Mix) – 5:00

In France, both the CD and vinyl versions contain "Paris City Boy", a version of "New York City Boy" recorded by Tennant and Lowe in 2003, replacing the original version.

Different versions of some songs were included on the U.S. release.

DVD
A DVD was released at the same time as the CD editions. The sleeve artwork is the same, but the track listing is chronological.

There are bonus videos including: both videos for "Opportunities (Let's Make Lots of Money)"; "Paninaro", which was released as a single in Italy; "How Can You Expect to Be Taken Seriously?" (brothers in rhythm remix) and "Was It Worth It?", which do not appear on the CD; "London", which was only released as a single in Germany; and extended videos for "Domino Dancing", "So Hard" and "Go West". The only video that is missing is the 1994 Comic Relief single "Absolutely Fabulous", which remains unavailable on DVD due to licensing hurdles.

The videos to "Miracles" and "Flamboyant" were not ready when the DVD went to press, so they were not included. They were released along with the videos for "I'm with Stupid", "Minimal" and "Numb" on the Pet Shop Boys: A Life in Pop documentary DVD.

The DVD also features a commentary by Neil Tennant, Chris Lowe and Chris Heath.

 "Opportunities (Let's Make Lots of Money)" (original version)
 "West End Girls"
 "Love Comes Quickly"
 "Opportunities (Let's Make Lots of Money)" (second version)
 "Suburbia"
 "Paninaro"
 "It's a Sin"
 "What Have I Done to Deserve This?"
 "Rent"
 "Always on My Mind"
 "Heart"
 "Domino Dancing"
 "Left to My Own Devices"
 "It's Alright"
 "So Hard"
 "Being Boring"
 "How Can You Expect to Be Taken Seriously?"
 "Where the Streets Have No Name (I Can't Take My Eyes Off You)"
 "Jealousy"
 "DJ Culture"
 "Was It Worth It?"
 "Can You Forgive Her?"
 "Go West"
 "I Wouldn't Normally Do This Kind of Thing"
 "Liberation"
 "Yesterday, When I Was Mad"
 "Paninaro '95"
 "Before"
 "Se a Vida É (That's the Way Life Is)"
 "Single-Bilingual"
 "A Red Letter Day"
 "Somewhere"
 "I Don't Know What You Want but I Can't Give It Any More"
 "New York City Boy"
 "You Only Tell Me You Love Me When You're Drunk"
 "Home and Dry"
 "I Get Along/E-mail"
 "London"
 "Domino Dancing" (extended version) [The 12" and Introspective Mix]
 "So Hard" (extended version) [The "Extended Dance Mix"]
 "Go West" (extended version) [The Mings Gone West: First and Second Movement Video Mix]

Charts

Weekly charts

Year-end charts

References

2003 greatest hits albums
Capitol Records compilation albums
Capitol Records remix albums
Capitol Records video albums
Parlophone compilation albums
Parlophone remix albums
Parlophone video albums
Pet Shop Boys compilation albums
Pet Shop Boys video albums